Wrigley Brook is a culverted watercourse in Greater Manchester which flows through Heywood and is a tributary of the River Roch. Originating in the Hareshill area to the South of Heywood, it flows northwards and joins the River Roch at Bottom O' th' Brow.

References
Old Ordnance Survey Maps Lancashire sheet 88.11 by Alan Godfrey and Paul Hindle.
http://randd.defra.gov.uk/Document.aspx?Document=FD2603_7222_PR.pdf

Rivers of the Metropolitan Borough of Rochdale
Rivers of Greater Manchester
1